YMO Versus The Human League is an EP released in Japan and Asia in April 1993. It was released by Alfa Records and is a collaboration between Japanese electropop/synthpop band Yellow Magic Orchestra and British new wave/synthpop band The Human League. It was the first release by The Human League after their abrupt dismissal from their 14-year-long recording contract with Virgin Records 10 months previously.

It features four tracks (taken from Yellow Magic Orchestra, Solid State Survivor and Naughty Boys). "Behind the Mask" was remixed by Mark Gamble (based on Michael Jackson's version) instead of the Human League. "Kimi Ni Mune Kyun" (Trans: "My Heart Beats, for You (A Holiday Affair)") has new English lyrics written by Philip Oakey and sung by Susan Ann Sulley and Joanne Catherall. The song was later included as a B-side to The Human League's "Tell Me When" in 1994.

Track listing
All songs arranged by Haruomi Hosono, Ryuichi Sakamoto, Yukihiro Takahashi, Philip Oakey, Joanne Catherall, Susan Ann Sulley and Mark Gamble.

References

External links
 http://www.the-black-hit-of-space.dk/ymo_vs_human_league.htm

1993 EPs
The Human League EPs
Alfa Records albums